Matthew 5:38 is the thirty-eighth verse of the fifth chapter of the Gospel of Matthew in the New Testament and is part of the Sermon on the Mount. This verse begins the antithesis on the commandment: "Eye for an eye".

Content
In the King James Version of the Bible the text reads:
Ye have heard that it hath been said, 
An eye for an eye, and a tooth for a tooth:

The World English Bible translates the passage as:
“You have heard that it was said, 
‘An eye for an eye, and a tooth for a tooth.’

The Novum Testamentum Graece text is:
Ἠκούσατε ὅτι ἐρρέθη
Ὀφθαλμὸν ἀντὶ ὀφθαλμοῦ καὶ ὀδόντα ἀντὶ ὀδόντος.

For a collection of other versions see BibleHub Matthew 5:38

Analysis
This verse begins in the same style as the earlier antitheses, that natural desire for retaliation or vengeance can be conveniently justified with a reference to the Old Testament: An eye for an eye, and a tooth for a tooth, known as the principle of lex talionis ("the law of retribution"), is an ancient statement of the principle of retributive punishment dating back to the Code of Hammurabi. This phrasing appears several times in the Old Testament at Exodus , Leviticus , and Deuteronomy . This was a moderate rule compared with the blood feuds described in Genesis . The New Testament scholar R. T. France notes that by Jesus' era such punishments were no longer in practice, rather they had been replaced with fines judged to be of equal value to the damage caused.  Thus, according to France, Jesus is not here condemning the violence or brutality of such punishments, but the very idea of retribution, which, together with the statement in the following few verses, forms the core of Jesus' teaching of nonviolence.

References

Sources

05:38
Human eyes in culture
Teeth
Revenge